F-box only protein 4 is a protein that in humans is encoded by the FBXO4 gene.

Function 

This gene encodes a member of the F-box protein family which is characterized by an approximately 40 amino acid motif, the F-box. The F-box proteins constitute one of the four subunits of the ubiquitin ligase complex called SCFs (SKP1-cullin-F-box), which function in phosphorylation-dependent ubiquitination. The F-box proteins are divided into 3 classes: Fbws containing WD-40 domains, Fbls containing leucine-rich repeats, and Fbxs containing either different protein-protein interaction modules or no recognizable motifs. The protein encoded by this gene belongs to the Fbxs class. Alternative splicing of this gene generates 2 transcript variants.

Interactions 

FBXO4 has been shown to interact with:
 CUL1, and
 SKP1A.

References

Further reading